is a dance-oriented Japanese pop band, formed in 1995 by producer and songwriter Tetsuya Komuro. Originally consisting of Komuro, Keiko Yamada and Marc Panther, the group's singles consistently hit the charts. In late 2002 Yoshiki, drummer and pianist for X Japan, joined the group, but he left the band about a year later.

Their 1996 debut album, Globe, sold over 4 million copies, and their 1998 single "wanna Be A Dreammaker" won the grand prix award at the 40th Japan Record Awards, the Japanese record industry's highest honor. Komuro also mentioned there will be some collaboration work with other artists with the artist title of Globe Featuring, and Globe Extreme for collaborations with Yoshiki.

Members
 Globe
 Tetsuya "TK" Komuro – The ex-pianist, producer and mastermind of the band. In the Globe Extreme era he played the guitar instead of keyboards.
 Keiko – The main vocalist of the band. Sings in Japanese and English.
 Marc Panther (real name ) – The rapper of the band. Sings in English, French and Japanese.

Globe Extreme
Yoshiki – Played piano and keyboards. He joined in September 2002, but by August 2005 he was already out of Globe because of work matters.

Support musician
 Jinsei Rikori – Drums and music programming

Background

1994–1998: Origins and early success
In the climb of his fame, producer Tetsuya Komuro organized one of his castings, searching for new singers in 1994, (especially one that was called Eurogroove Night). The young girl Keiko Yamada assisted there, encouraged by her friends, and her voice undoubtedly got the attention of Komuro instantly. He chose her initially for a solo career. Another one of the careers that TK was thinking about producing at that time was that of the model and MTV VJ Marc Panther, who knew English and French apart from Japanese. Komuro finally had the idea to make a band using Keiko and Marc in main vocals and himself as keyboardist (and also some vocals).

The band signed with label Avex in 1995, creating their own sub-label called Avex Globe. In August of the same year they released their first single, entitled "Feel Like Dance". Little by little the band was becoming more popular. Their 4th single, "Departures", released in 1996, sold more than 2 million copies. The band's first studio album Globe, also released in 1996, became a sensation, managing to sell more than 4 million copies according to Oricon. The album was also the best selling one of that year. After having obtained such explosive sales in only two years of work, with more than 12 million singles sold (only in Japan) and 13 million copies of albums, the band was established as a premiere pop band inside the Japanese culture.

The band released their second studio album Faces Places on March 12, 1997. To promote the album Faces Places, the band began their first large scale tour called Globe@4Domes in which they performed at the four biggest Japanese domes: Osaka, Fukuoka, Nagoya, and Tokyo. All of them were amazing successes. A few months later they began their first overseas tour around Asia alongside another artist from the Komuro family where they shared the stage with Namie Amuro and TRF. In 1998 they released 4 different singles in about one month in a project called the Brand New Globe 4 Singles. One of those songs, "Wanna Be a Dreammaker", won the grand prix award at the Japan Record Award.

1999–2002: Experimentation and declining sales
After a regular period of singles and albums, including their massive hit best-of compilation Cruise Record 1995-2000 (#1 at Oricon), the band started to experiment with their music, exploring new musical areas. The first big step in this new era was the Globe Featuring project of 2000, in which each member of the band released one single as solo artists. The most successful of the 3 singles was Keiko's "On the Way to You," and the singer went on her first solo nationwide tour of Japan because of the success.

As new music influences were being received in Japan, electronic music like trance became one of the main styles that Globe decided to try. However, this new style was not so well received by Globe's fanbase. Their 4th studio album, Outernet, sold poorly compared to previous works; Globe went from selling millions of copies of an album to selling a mere 100 thousand. But Komuro was not at all willing to give up his new style of music for the pop tunes that made Globe so popular in the early nineties.

In 2002 Globe got even more into the trance style, releasing 2 studio albums in that year: Lights and its sequel, Lights2. In July of that year Globe and Belgian DJ Push collaborated on the single "Dreams From Above" for the set of Avex's Cyber Trance series. On September 1 Yoshiki, former drummer and pianist for X Japan, joined Globe as its fourth member. Meanwhile, the band was appearing in A-Nation, and the news of the change spread throughout Asia and the world quickly. Then on November 22, it was announced that Tetsuya Komuro and Keiko were marrying. The ceremony was televised live, causing considerable controversy. The new era of the band, known as Globe Extreme (now with Yoshiki), began some weeks later, with the single "Seize the Light", a song created by Yoshiki and produced by Komuro. A second "best of" album was also released to commemorate the first 8 years of Globe's musical career, entitled 8 Years: Many Classic Moments (#2 at Oricon).

2003–2006: Hiatus, solo interests, and new style
After the release of a new album called Level 4 and "Get It On feat. Keiko" (the only works with Yoshiki), the band went on a 2-year hiatus, and its members pursued solo interests. Keiko was the first one to go solo, releasing her first single "KCO" in December 2003. Months later in 2004, Marc started his solo project under the pseudonym of 245, a project that has plans for international projection beyond Japan. Later it was announced that the Globe Extreme era had ended and that Yoshiki was leaving the band. The band went back to having three members: TK, Keiko and Marc. Yoshiki's departure from the group was not completely clarified, but apparently the musician had other work-related commitments. The only release from Globe during 2004 was their complete singles collection, Globe Decade: Single History 1995-2004, which included all of the band's singles from "Feel Like Dance" to "Get It On feat. Keiko" (a limited edition deluxe box contained every single, album, and DVD ever released by the band).

In 2005, after the two-year hiatus, Globe returned to the musical scene with a new single called "Here I Am" (used as the opening theme of the Black Jack anime), and in August of that year released their 9th studio album Globe2 Pop/Rock to commemorate their 11th anniversary. This album was supposed to be a continuation of the band's first album; the hard electronic music was replaced by pop and rock influences. They also released their first online single through iTunes Japan called "Judgement".

In 2006 it was announced that Globe was about to release their 31st single "Soldier" on March 1. Later that release was cancelled, and as its replacement the band released a new studio album on March 23, entitled Maniac. The album didn't have any single or music video promoting it. Only "Soldier" was used in ads, using a few incomplete scenes from the shooting of the PV in TV spots because the full music video was never finished. A few months later they went to Latin America to record new material for their first mini album, New Deal, released on August 9, 2006. Latin American musical influences were the main theme of the mini album, in which Spanish-language phrases were added to songs for the first time.

New Deal would be their final album to date.

2007–2008: TK's legal controversy and presumed hiatus
Although the band had not released anything since 2006's mini-album New Deal, no official announcement was made by TK that they have disbanded. They were originally set to release two new singles in 2008, covers of TM Network's songs "Get Wild" and "Self Control." However, these singles were cancelled by Avex because of Tetsuya Komuro's fraud controversy. All of their music was removed from digital downloads, such as iTunes (in both Japan and US).

2009–2016: Return from hiatus
On August 30, 2009, Globe officially announced their return at the a-nation music festival. TK appeared first, speaking about the return and end of the legal issues. He played several of his greatest hits (both by Globe and songs he wrote for other artists) on piano. Keiko and Marc then joined him and they sang "Face" and "Many Classic Moments". Their music returned to iTunes (Japan and US) around this date as well.

On October 24, 2011, Keiko Yamada was admitted to a hospital and diagnosed with a subarachnoid hemorrhage. She subsequently underwent a five-hour operation to repair the condition.

2017–2018: Possible return and eventual disbandment
On June 28, 2017, Globe returned without Keiko and appeared during a televised show to perform with singer Hiroko Shimabukuro of Speed. They performed the singles "Face" and "Precious Memories".

On August 15, Tetsuya Komuro posted on his Instagram a video in which one hears Keiko interpreting an unpublished song, named "Keiko 2016–2017".

TK wrote a comment : "After she got sick, I made a song for her to try to sing. It's Keiko's voice. I think she's getting better now", which implied the entire Globe lineup was in the works of a reunion.

In January 2018, it was reported that Komuro had been having an affair on Keiko while she was in recovery. Shortly after this was reported, Komuro then announced his retirement from the music industry, thus essentially putting an end to Globe, among his other projects. Since then, however, Komuro has returned to the music industry, and there were also reports of divorce settlement talks with Keiko. In February 2021, their divorce was finalized, and the future of Globe is even more uncertain than ever. Still, both sides express the hope and possibility that despite their divorce, they could still work together in Globe in the future.

Discography

Studio albums

See also
 List of best-selling music artists in Japan

External links
 Official website

Avex Group artists
Experimental musical groups
Japanese electronic music groups
Japanese pop music groups
Japanese electropop groups
Musical groups established in 1995
Musical groups from Tokyo
Tetsuya Komuro
1995 establishments in Japan